Penteleu or Cașcaval de Penteleu is the name of a Romanian cheese made with sheep milk, originally from the Buzău Mountains region. It is made using the same process as caşcaval, and can be consumed as a table cheese or it can be used to complement traditional Romanian dishes such as mămăligă.

Notes and references

See also 
 Kashkaval

Romanian cheeses